Ellery Queen is a pseudonym for authors Frederic Dannay and Manfred Bennington Lee and the name of the fictional character that they created.

Ellery Queen may also refer to:
The Adventures of Ellery Queen, a summary of representation of the Ellery Queen character in various media 
The Adventures of Ellery Queen (radio program), an American radio program that was first broadcast in 1939 and ended in 1948
Ellery Queen (house name), information about use of the pseudonym by authors other than Dannay and Lee
Ellery Queen (TV series), an American television program broadcast in 1975-1976
Ellery Queen's Mystery Magazine, a monthly American magazine specializing in crime fiction